Saltabarranca is a municipality  located in the south zone of the State of Veracruz, Mexico, about  from state capital Xalapa. The origin of the name of this existing municipality is not known from the creation of the State of Veracruz (1824).

Geographic Limits

The municipality of Saltabarranca is delimited to the north by Lerdo de Tejada to the east by Angel R. Cabada, to the south and west by Tlacotalpan.  There is watered by the rivers San Juan, Ingenio and others, which are tributaries of the Papaloapan river, being outlined the renowned San Agustín and the Tecolapan.

Agriculture

It produces principally maize, beans, sugarcane, watermelon and green chile.

Celebrations

In Saltabarranca, in May takes place the celebration in honor to Virgen de la Concepción, Patron of the town, and in December takes place the celebration in honor to Virgen de Guadalupe.

Weather

The weather in Saltabarranca is warm  and wet all year with rains in summer and autumn.

References

External links 

  Municipal Official webpage
  Municipal Official Information

Municipalities of Veracruz